Mont Blanc is the highest mountain in the Alps

Mont Blanc may refer to:

Locations 
 Mountains in the Alps
Mont Blanc massif
Mont Blanc de Courmayeur, in the Italian part of the Mont Blanc massif, is the second-highest peak in the Alps
Mont Blanc de Cheilon, a mountain in the Pennine Alps in Switzerland
 Mont Blanc Tunnel, a tunnel beneath the Mont Blanc mountain
 Pont du Mont-Blanc, a bridge in Geneva
 Mont Blanc (Moon), the lunar mountain
 Mont-Blanc, Quebec, a municipality in the Laurentides region of Quebec, Canada

Ships 
 , a World War I era French munition ship involved in the Halifax Explosion
 French ship Mont-Blanc (1793), of the French Navy

Other uses 
 Mont Blanc (dessert), a dessert
 Mont-Blanc (department) is a former département of the First French Empire
 Mont Blanc (poem) is the title of an 1816 poem by Percy Bysshe Shelley
 Mont Blanc Restaurant is a former restaurant in London

TV8 Mont-Blanc, a Savoie-based television channel
An older name for Montblanc (company), a German manufacturer of writing instruments, watches and accessories
 Mont Blanc (film), Estonian 2001 animated film

See also 
 Montblanc (disambiguation)